The Punjab Highway Patrol (reporting name: PHP) serves as the safe highways police for all Provincial Highways of Punjab. The PHP patrol the roads to maintain safe highways and prevent crimes from taking place, especially in rural regions of Punjab. Recently, in many districts, some of the patrolling units have also been given the responsibility for imposing tickets for traffic violations.

History

The Chief Minister of the Punjab announced the establishment of Patrolling Posts on the highways throughout the province on 8 January 2003. The object was to provide security to the people traveling on the highways and improve thana (Police Station) culture. 450 Patrolling Post would be established in two phases. By 31 March 2005 more than 190 posts have become operational and others will soon be commissioned. More than 11,500 constables have been recruited and trained in two years. They receive a special pay package which is almost twice that of the regular police. The Punjab Highway Patrol is headed by an officer of the rank of an Additional Inspector-General of Police.

Head of Organization
 Additional Inspectors General of police is the Head of Punjab Highway Patrol.
The list of heads of this unit who commanded this organisation of Punjab Police is as under:

Objectives
Control crime on highways with a system of foot and mobile patrol within an area extending to 220  feet on either side of the designated highways
Apprehend criminals and hand them over to the local police
Preserve the crime scene and inform the local police after commission of an offence
Take measures to control traffic accidents
In case of accident, provide first aid to the injured and transport the seriously injured to hospital
Serve as reporting centres and provide emergency help in the form of guidance and road-side assistance
Keep the highways clear of encroachments in coordination with the competent authority
Conduct effective nakabandi (picketing on roads/highways) to stop a   suspect vehicle following a crime or an accident
Check over-speeding and use of pressure horns in public service vehicles
Ensure round the clock presence of uniformed, well trained, well educated, alert and vigilant force
Traffic management on 12 Highways across the province

Training
Training occurs at the Chohung Training Center in Lahore. In addition to regular police training, the personnel of the Punjab Highway Patrol have been given 1 month of elite police training, to deal with criminals. They have also been given instructions in the following areas:

Character building 
Principles of patrolling
Preservation of the scene of crime 
Stop, search and arrest
First aid
Public dealing / Community policing
Safety and cleanliness.

Uniform

In order to distinguish Punjab Highway Patrol from general police a special uniform has been designed.

Helpline
In case of emergencies for help/assistance, Punjab Highway Patrol has established a helpline 1124 for road commuters.

Vehicles 

Toyota Hilux (Single Cab & Double Cabin Vigo)

Weapons 
AK 47
H&K G3
H&K MP5
Glock pistols
Beretta 92fs
TT pistols
shotguns

See also
 Punjab Police (Pakistan)
 Provincial Highways of Punjab
 Elite Police
 Rescue 15 bwp
 National Highways & Motorway Police

References

External links
 

Provincial law enforcement agencies of Pakistan
Punjab Police (Pakistan)
Road transport in Pakistan